The newton-metre (also newton metre or newton meter; symbol N⋅m or N m) is the unit of torque (also called ) in the International System of Units (SI). One newton-metre is equal to the torque resulting from a force of one newton applied perpendicularly to the end of a moment arm that is one metre long.  The nonstandard notation Nm occurs in some fields.

The unit is also used less commonly as a unit of work, or energy, in which case it is equivalent to the more common and standard SI unit of energy, the joule. In this usage the metre term represents the distance travelled or displacement in the direction of the force, and not the perpendicular distance from a fulcrum as it does when used to express torque. This usage is generally discouraged, since it can lead to confusion as to whether a given quantity expressed in newton-metres is a torque or a quantity of energy. However, since torque represents energy transferred or expended per angle of revolution, one newton-metre of torque is equivalent to one joule per radian.

Newton-metres and joules are dimensionally equivalent in the sense that they have the same expression in SI base units,

but are distinguished to avoid misunderstandings when a torque is mistaken for an energy or vice versa. Similar examples of dimensionally equivalent units include Pa versus J/m3, Bq versus Hz, and ohm versus ohm per square.

Conversion factors
1 kilogram-force metre = 9.80665 N⋅m

1 newton-metre ≈ 0.73756215 pound-force-feet
1 pound-foot ≡ 1 pound-force-foot ≈ 1.35581795 N⋅m
1 ounce-inch ≡ 1 ounce-force-inch ≈ 7.06155181 mN⋅m (millinewton-metres)
1 dyne-centimetre = 10−7 N⋅m

See also

Bending moment
Spring scale
Torque tester
Newton-second, the derived SI unit of impulse

References

Units of torque
SI derived units